Alamcode  is area of Attingal, a northern suburb of Trivandrum, the largest city and capital of the state of Kerala, India.  Alamcode falls under the jurisdiction of Attingal Municipality which forms a part of the larger Trivandrum metropolitan area.  The nearest Airport is Trivandrum International Airport (33 km) and Kadakkavur Railway Station (6.3 km) is the nearest Railway Station.

Demographics

As of the 2011 Census of India, Alamcode had a population of 14,762 with 6268 males and 7994 females.
Alamcode is a part of Attingal City.

References

Cities and towns in Thiruvananthapuram district